Atlanship SA, founded in 1982, is a Swiss shipping company that specializes in transporting refrigerated fresh and concentrated orange juice.  It is headquartered in Lausanne, Switzerland with a representative office in Rotterdam. They provide full ship management services.

The company today
Atlanship operational areas include South America, Europe, the United States, Japan and Korea.

In 2011 the Croatian shipyard Brodosplit, in the Adriatic port of Split, delivered the biggest ever orange juice carrier to Atlanship SA. Orange Star is 190 metres long and 32 wide, and has a capacity of 35,750 tonnes. This giant juice tanker is the replacement vessel for the old Orange Star which was in service from 1975 to 2010 and then sold for scrap in India.

The fleet

References

External links
 "Train Crew In BRM"

Companies based in the canton of Vaud
Shipping companies of Switzerland